Nsawam is a town in south Ghana and is the capital of the Nsawam-Adoagyire Municipal District, a district in the Eastern Region of south Ghana. The main ethnic group is Akan, followed by Ga and then Ewe. Nsawam is controlled by Nsawam-Adoagyire Municipal District (ASMD). As of 2013, Nsawam has a settlement population of 44,522 people. Nsawam is situated on the main railway  between Accra and Kumasi and highway to Kumasi. It has Densu river acting as a border between itself and Adoagyiri. Densu River, is the main source of water for both domestic and industrial purposes for people in and around Nsawam.

Name
There are two other places in Ghana with the same name.

Security Prison
Nsawam is the location of Nsawam Medium Security Prison.

Education

Secondary education
Nsawam has two major secondary schools – St. Martins Secondary School and Nsawam Secondary School. Nsawam has several prominent junior high schools, Nana Osae Djan and Perseverance school complex debatably being the most prominent among others such as Rev. Father Wieggers Roman Catholic school, Presby kindergarten, Primary & JHS.  Ignis School. Anglican A & B Basic school, Jerisam International School, Nsawam Methodist Basic School and Good foundation international school.

Higher education
Also situated in Nsawam are other schools, including Prince Boateng Memorial school, which runs from the nursery to senior high school and a vocational institute, in addition to BOPA College of Arts and Sciences, a private vocational school for young women where they learn sewing, catering and designing of clothing. In Nsawam there is also a Business Complex School dedicated to the grooming of Secretaries and entry-level business students. This school, Millennium Kings Academy, located on the Court Street, Nsawam, was established almost 30 years ago.

Climate

Healthcare 
The town of Nsawam is the most preferred hotspot for health care in the Nsawam-Adoagyire Municipal as it houses the Nsawam Government Hospital, not far from the Nsawam Medium Security Prisons, New Life Hospital, Notre Dame Clinic all in Adoagyiri, and over five other recognised health centres

Transport

Train and road
Nsawam is served indirectly by a railway station on the Ghana national railway network, which serves as a link between Accra and Kumasi. Over the last decade, however, the coaches run, on the Accra-Nsawam route as the only relic from the glorious days of rail transport.

Nsawam serves as the major business center for most farming communities such as Pakro, Fotobi, Asiaw-Krom, Dobro, Nkyenekyene, Ahodjo, etc.

See also 
 Railway stations in Ghana

References

External links 
 Ghana-pedia webpage - Nsawam

 	

Populated places in the Eastern Region (Ghana)